Gruting is a hamlet on the island of Mainland, Shetland in Scotland.

There is a late Neolithic site on the Ness of Grutling, where burnt barley has been found.
An area of about  shows signs of neolithic agriculture and neolithic genocide, with about fifty piles of stones cleared from the fields. 
The barley had a radiocarbon date of within 120 years of 1564 BC. Pottery found on the Ness of Gruting shows affinities with Neolithic wares from the Hebrides, indicating cultural contacts.
Split flakes of porphyry for skinning have been found.

Gallery

References
Citations

Sources

External links

Canmore - Gruting, St Mary's Chapel and Burial Ground site record

Villages in Mainland, Shetland